Phymasterna is a genus of longhorn beetles of the subfamily Lamiinae, containing the following species:

 Phymasterna affinis Breuning, 1980
 Phymasterna annulata Fairmaire, 1903
 Phymasterna gracilis Breuning, 1957
 Phymasterna lacteoguttata Laporte de Castelnau, 1840
 Phymasterna maculifrons Gahan, 1890
 Phymasterna rufocastanea Fairmaire, 1889

Incertae sedis
 Phymasterna cyaneoguttata Fairmaire, 1886

References

Tragocephalini
Cerambycidae genera